He Is We is an American indie pop act from Tacoma, Washington formed in 2008 by lead singer Rachel Taylor and guitarist Trevor Kelly,with Taylor being its only consistent member.

Career

2008–2011: Formation and early years

Rachel Taylor and Trevor Kelly met while working at Ted Brown Music Company, a music store in their hometown of Tacoma, Washington. Rachel and Trevor were the founding duo that comprised He Is We. The touring members initially included Harrison Allen (drums), Carman Kubanda (guitar), and Aaron Campbell (keyboard/guitar). Later, Jake Randle (bass guitar) replaced Aaron Campbell. He Is We initially relied on social networking, using websites such as Myspace and Facebook. In 2009, they were named PureVolume's number one unsigned band of the year. This online presence and the release of an album of old demos in February 2010 led to their signing with Universal Motown Records. Prior to the release of My Forever, He Is We toured with The Rocket Summer.  Their debut album My Forever hit number 6 on Billboards Heatseekers Album Charts.  On their website, He Is We says that the start of the band came from "the idea that someone who you pass everyday can influence the rest of your life ... and you would never know."

2012–2017: Lineup changes, She Is We, and other releases
In early 2012, Rachel Taylor was diagnosed with ankylosing spondylitis, and Stevie Scott filled in for the remainder of the tour. Despite being officially replaced by Scott in August, and having stated "Walking away from the label would mean that I would be walking away from the He Is We name but I would regain my freedom to be me. I would regain my ability to connect with you fans 100% with my words. I wouldn't feel like I can only release what THEY want me to. I could be the soul that longs to escape this dreary vessel.", she returned to the band at the end of October 2012, while Trevor Kelly departed to form his own band.

After Kelly left with Stevie Scott in 2012, Rachel continued to pursue the project herself. She said that she planned to release new music and tour in 2013. In 2013, their song "All About Us", with Aaron Gillespie, was included on The Mortal Instruments: City of Bones soundtrack. Despite rumors surfaced of her changing the name of He Is We and moving in a new direction, she insisted that the rumors were completely untrue and she would do no such thing. However, on June 23, 2014, Rachel Taylor broke away as a solo artist with her debut EP, Come Alive.

In August 2015, Taylor announced she was launching "a He Is We 2.0" with Adamm Mitchell entitled She Is We. On October 22, 2015, She Is We released their first single "Boomerang" and announced that their debut album War would be available for pre-order on October 23, 2015. It was released by Vanguard Records on March 18, 2016. War was made available to stream prior to release on Billboard's website on March 11, 2016.

In August 2016, Taylor announced that she had reunited with bandmate Trevor Kelly and that they were writing new songs. In September 2016, Taylor and Kelly announced that they would be touring together.

In August 2017, touring members McBride, Mitchell and Chamberlain left the band and in September 2017, touring guitarist Macy Santa Maria accused Taylor of sexually assaulting her. Taylor responded with her own statement, denying that a sexual assault had occurred and alleging that Santa Maria's statement mischaracterized her actions and the nature of sexual assault. Following Santa Maria's allegations, He Is We were removed as support for Secondhand Serenade's fall 2017 tour. On June 4, 2019, Rachel Taylor was found not guilty of sexual assault following a one-day trial in Jamestown, North Dakota. Taylor was found guilty of a separate disorderly conduct misdemeanor charge, which carries up to a $1,500 fine and potentially 30 days in jail.
 
In March 2017, He is We released Fall out of Line to iTunes, which contains old demos and re-released songs. The band's "For the Runaways" tour (March and April 2017) promoted the album by focusing on older He Is We songs. Trevor Kelly did not tour with the band during the "For the Runaways" tour, with Hans Hessburg filling in on acoustic guitar.

2018–2022: He Is We Chapter One and Hold My Heart

In March 2018, He is We released He Is We Chapter One digitally, which contains re-released songs. Rachel Taylor announced in February 2018 that she was back in studio and that she would release a new He Is We EP in March or April 2018.

He Is We announced they would be touring with Vendetta Red in March 2018.

He Is We's new EP, Hold My Heart, was released on April 10, 2018.

2022-present : Treehouse

He Is We's second studio album entitled Treehouse was released on 11 February 2022.

Discography 
A Mess it Grows (2009)
Old Demos (2009)
Track list:
 I Wouldn't Mind
 Blame It On The Rain (Acoustic Guitar)
 Breathe
 Pardon Me (Acoustic Guitar)
 Blame It on the Rain (Acoustic)
 Give It All
 Happily Ever After (Acoustic)
 Light A Way
 Pardon Me
 Pour Me Out
 Too Beautiful
 Radio
Note: Only studio recorded demos listed.
My Forever (2010)
Acoustic/Live EP (2010)
Track list:
 And Run (acoustic/live)
 Happily Ever After (acoustic/live)
 Everything You Do (acoustic/live)
 Blame It on the Rain (acoustic/live)
 All About Us (acoustic/live)
 Prove You Wrong (acoustic/live)
 Fall (acoustic/live)
 Forever and Ever (acoustic Live)
Skip To the Good Part - EP (2011)
Track list:
 All About Us (feat. Adam Young from Owl City)
 Our July In the Rain
 Tell Me
 Skip to the Good Part
 Our July In the Rain (Stripped Version)
 Prove You Wrong (Alternative Version)
 Fall Out Of Line - EP (2017)
Track list:
 I Wouldn't Mind
 Breathe
 Pour Me Out
 Give It All
 Radio
 A Mess It Grows
 His Name
 The One About Indifference
 Pardon Me
 He Is We Chapter One - EP (2017)
Track list:
 Light A Way
 Happily Ever After Acoustic
 Blame It On The Rain Acoustic
 Pardon Me Acoustic
 Too Beautiful
 Hold My Heart - EP (2018)
Track list:
 Dear Adam
 Every Other Man
 All I Need
 To Infinity and Beyond
 Hold My Heart

° Treehouse (2022)

Compilation appearances
 Rockin' Romance 2 – "Replay" (Iyaz cover)

References

External links 
 He Is We singer Rachel Taylor's new site
 Alter the Press Interview
 He Is We on Facebook
 He Is We lyrics

Indie pop groups from Washington (state)
Performing groups established in 2008
2008 establishments in Washington (state)
Musical groups from Tacoma, Washington
Universal Motown Records artists